Per Bach Laursen (born 7 February 1962 in Løgstør) is from Overlade near Løgstør, he is proprietor and owner of Lundgård. He is also the current mayor of Vesthimmerlands Municipality he is from Venstre, he was preceded by Knud Vældgaard Kristensen who was from Det Konservative Folkeparti, he has been a Vice-mayor of Vesthimmerland Municipality and he also ran for mayor of Vesthimmerland Municipality in 2013.  In the 2017 Municipality election he received the most votes of them all of the candidates of Vesthimmerland Municipality, and he is the current mayor of Vesthimmerland Municipality.

Per Bach Laursen has been active in many different organizations mostly agriculture organizations, some of the following:
 Former president The Danish Swine Producers.
 Former Chairman of the European Swine producers.
 Board member of LaDS Holding A/S.
 Board member of kartoffelmelsfabrikken AKV-Langholt.
 Council Member of Det dyreetiske råd (English: The Animal Council).
 Vice Chairman of Tolvmandssektionen.

See also
Jens Lauritzen
Aars

References

1962 births
Living people
Venstre (Denmark) politicians
Mayors of places in Denmark